The 2019 Spikers' Turf season was the fourth season of the men's volleyball league Spikers' Turf, the counterpart of the women's Premier Volleyball League. In 2014, the Shakey's V-League introduced a men's division during its 21st conference. The following year, Sports Vision, the organizers of the Shakey's V-League decided to spin-off the men's vision as a separate tournament, giving birth to the Spikers' Turf.

Reinforced conference

Participating teams

Preliminary round

Final round

Awards

Final standings

Open conference

Participating teams

Preliminary round

Final round

Awards

Final standings

See also 
2019 PVL season

References 

Spikers' Turf
2019 in Philippine sport